The Cascade Collegiate Conference (or Cascade Conference) is a college athletic conference affiliated with the National Association of Intercollegiate Athletics (NAIA).  Member schools are located in the Northwestern United States.  The conference's members compete in 15 sports. The current commissioner of the conference is Robert Cashell.

History

Chronological timeline
 1993 - The Cascade Collegiate Conference (CCC) was founded. Charter members included Albertson College of Idaho (now the College of Idaho), Concordia College, Portland (later Concordia University–Portland), Eastern Oregon State College (now Eastern Oregon University), George Fox College (George Fox University), Northwest Nazarene College (now Northwest Nazarene University), the Oregon Institute of Technology (Oregon Tech), Southern Oregon State College (now Southern Oregon University), Western Baptist College (now Corban University) and Western Oregon State College (now Western Oregon University), effective beginning the 1993-94 academic year.
 1995 - George Fox left the CCC and the NAIA to join the Division III ranks of the National Collegiate Athletic Association (NCAA) and the Northwest Conference (NWC), effective after the 1994-95 academic year.
 1997 - Cascade College and Northwest College (now Northwest University) joined the CCC, effective in the 1997-98 academic year.
 1998 - Western Oregon left the CCC and the NAIA to join the NCAA Division II ranks and the Pacific West Conference (PacWest), effective after the 1997-98 academic year; while remaining in the conference as an affiliate member for some sports until the 1999-2000 academic year.
 1999 - The Evergreen State College and Warner Pacific College (now Warner Pacific University) joined the CCC, effective in the 1999-2000 academic year.
 2007 - Northwest Christian College (now Bushnell University) joined the CCC, effective in the 2007-08 academic year.
 2008 - The University of British Columbia joined the CCC as an affiliate member for baseball, effective in the 2009 spring season (2008-09 academic year).
 2009 - Cascade left the CCC as the school announced that it would close, effective after the 2008-09 academic year.
 2015 - Multnomah University and Walla Walla University joined the CCC, effective in the 2015-16 academic year.
 2015 - Three institutions joined the CCC as affiliate members: Rocky Mountain College for men's and women's soccer; Carroll College and the University of Providence for men's and women's soccer and softball, effective in the 2015-16 academic year.
 2017 - Four institutions joined the CCC as affiliate members: Embry–Riddle Aeronautical University–Prescott, Menlo College, Montana State University–Northern and Simpson University (with Providence also adding the sport in its CCC affiliate membership), effective in the 2017-18 academic year.
 2018 - Life Pacific University joined the CCC as an affiliate member for men's wrestling, while British Columbia added men's and women's golf, and men's and women's track & field in its CCC affiliate membership, effective in the 2018-19 academic year.
 2019 - Arizona Christian University and Vanguard University joined the CCC as affiliate members for women's wrestling (with Life Pacific, Menlo and Providence also adding the sport in its CCC affiliate membership), effective in the 2019-20 academic year.
 2020 - Lewis–Clark State College joined the CCC, effective in the 2020-21 academic year.
 2021 - Simpson added women's wrestling in its CCC affiliate membership, effective in the 2021-22 academic year. Life Pacific dropped their wrestling programs in 2022.

Member schools

Current members
The CCC currently has 12 full members, all but five are private schools:

Notes

Affiliate members
The CCC currently has 10 affiliate members, all but two are private schools:

Notes

Former members
The CCC had five former full members, all but one were private schools:

Notes

Former affiliate members
The CCC had three former affiliate members, two of them were private schools:

Notes

Membership timeline

Fielded sports

Fall
Men's cross country: ten schools participate
Women's cross country: ten schools participate
Men's soccer: fourteen schools participate 
Women's soccer: Thirteen schools participate
Women's Volleyball: all full member schools participate

Winter
Men's basketball: all full member schools participate
Women's basketball: all full member schools participate
Wrestling: Added in 2017, 12 men's teams and seven women's teams participate

Spring
Baseball: seven schools participate
Golf (men's & women's): eight men's and seven women's teams participate
Softball: eleven schools participate 
Men's track and field: ten schools participate
Women's track and field: ten schools participate

Sports not sponsored
 College of Idaho participates in men's and women's skiing as a member of the Northwest Conference of the United States Collegiate Ski and Snowboard Association, men's and women's swimming, and women's tennis, and football in the Frontier Conference.
 Eastern Oregon participates in football as a member of the Frontier Conference.
 Southern Oregon participates in football as a member of the Frontier Conference.

Commissioners

Howard Morris (1994–2003)
Phil Pifer (2003–2006)
Bart Valentine (2007)
Dave Haglund (2007–2012)
Robert Cashell (2012–present)

Champions

Conference titles by school

Cross country

Men

Women

Soccer

Men

Women

Volleyball

Basketball

Men

Women

Baseball

Golf

Men

Women

Softball

Track and field

Men

Women

References

External links

 
College sports in Oregon
1988 establishments in Oregon
Articles which contain graphical timelines